Australia was represented by one athlete in the first Paralympic Taekwondo event at the  2020 Tokyo Paralympics.

Medal Tally

Summer Paralympic Games

2020 Tokyo

Australia was represented by: 
Women -  Janine Watson 
Officials - Team Manager - Benjamin Hartmann  
Janine Watson won the bronze medal in the Women's +58kg

Detailed Australian Results

References

Australian Paralympic teams
Taekwondo in Australia